Jaljulia, officially also spelled Jaljulye, is an Arab town in Israel near Kfar Saba.

History 
In Roman times the village was known as Galgulis, while during the Crusader period it was referred to as Jorgilia in 1241 C.E.    It has been suggested that a Crusader sugar  factory was later turned into an Ottoman mosque.

In 1265 C.E. (663 H) Sultan Baybars allocated equal shares of the village to three of his amirs. One of these, amir Badr al-Din Baktash al-Fakri, included his section of the village in a waqf he established. Excavations of a building close to the Mamluk khan yielded ceramics dating from that period.

Ottoman era
In 1517, the village was included in the Ottoman Empire with the rest of Palestine, and in the 1596 tax-records it appeared located in the nahiya (subdistrict) of Banu Sa´b, part of Sanjak of Nablus, with a population of 100 households ("Khana"), all Muslim.  The villagers paid taxes on a number of crops, including wheat and barley, as well as "summer crops", "occasional revenues", "goats and bees", and a market toll. There was also a poll tax, jizya, paid by all the inhabitants in the Sanjak of Nablus. Total taxes were 18,450 akçe, of which 1/6 went to a waqf.

Jaljulia appeared under the name of Gelgeli on Jacotin's map drawn-up during Napoleon's invasion in 1799.

In 1870, Victor Guérin found that the village had six hundred inhabitants. In 1882, the Palestine Exploration Fund's Survey of Western Palestine described it as being a large adobe village on the plain. The mosque was described as fine, but ruined. A ruined Khan was also mentioned. Water was supplied by a well on the west side of the village.

During the Sinai and Palestine Campaign of World War I, the village was on the Ottoman front line and was damaged by British artillery.

British Mandate era

In the 1922 census of Palestine conducted by the British Mandate authorities, Jaljulieh had a population of 123 Muslims, increasing in the 1931 census to 260, still all Muslim, in a total of 60 houses.

By the 1945 statistics, the village had 740 inhabitants, all Muslims. They owned a total of 11,873 dunams of land, while 447 dunams were public. Jews owned 365 dunams of land. A total of 2,708 dunams were for citrus and bananas, 175 dunams for plantations and irrigable land, 9,301 for cereals, while 15 dunams were built-up (urban) land.

After the 1948 war, Jaljulia was on the Israeli side of the ceasefire line and its became part of Israel. It was transferred to Israel in the 1951 armistice agreement.

Sports
In 2010, a tennis school was established in Jaljulia by Iman Jabber and Daniel Kessel. In 2011, 50 girls and 20 boys signed up for tennis lessons. The school organizes coexistence matches between Jaljulia and Ra'anana.

Archaeology
An archaeological dig started in 2017 at Jaljulia uncovered, at about a five-meter depth, a half-million-year-old "paradise" for Homo erectus hunter-gatherers, including hundreds of knapped flint hand-axes. According to the Israel Antiquities Authority, recurrent occupation of the site indicates that prehistoric humans possessed a geographic memory of the place and could have returned here as a part of a seasonal cycle.

Landmarks 
The mosque is locally known as Jami Abu´l-Awn, which associates it with the 15th-century religious leader Shams al-Din Abu´l-Awn Muhammad al-Ghazzi, who is known to have come from the town. The architecture of the mosque is, according to Petersen, consistent with a 15th or early 16th century construction date. At present the structure consists of one large vaulted chamber, and three small barrel-vaulted cells. A large second chamber to the west was destroyed by British artillery during World War I.

The khan is opposite the mosque. It was built by Sayf al-Din Tankiz, the governor of Damascus 1312–1340, and it was still functioning in the 16th century, when it was mentioned in an Ottoman firman. In the 19th century it was seen by Guérin, who described it as a beautiful khan with a (ruined) polygonal minaret. Petersen, who surveyed the structure in 1996, found the courtyard entirely overgrown and it was not possible to detect any features within; however, he notes that a 19th-century visitor had mentioned that there was "a great round well" in the centre.

See also
 Arab localities in Israel
 Barid, Muslim postal network strengthened in Palestine during the Mamluk period (roads, bridges, khans)
 Tawfik Khatib (born 1954), former Israeli Arab politician, Knesset member (1996–2003)
 Shadi Abu Dib (born 1975), former Arab–Israeli footballer, youth team coach
 Mustafa Murrar (1929 – 2021), a Palestinian storyteller and children's author

References

Bibliography

 ( p.37, p.340)
 

 

Hartmann, Richard (1910): Die Straße von Damaskus nach Kairo Zeitschrift der Deutschen Morgenländischen Gesellschaft › Bd. 64, passim; (Cited in Petersen, 2001)
Heyd, Uriel (1960): Ottoman Documents on Palestine, 1552-1615, Oxford University Press, Oxford. Cited in Petersen (2001)

 Cited in Petersen (2001)

MPF: Ipsirli and al-Tamimi (1982): The Muslim Pious Foundations and Real Estates in Palestine. Gazza, Al-Quds al-Sharif, Nablus and Ajlun Districts according to 16th-Century Ottoman Tahrir Registers, Organisation of Islamic Conference, Istanbul 1402/1982. Cited in Petersen (2001).

  
 

al-'Ulaymi Sauvaire (editor) (1876): Histoire de Jérusalem et d'Hébron depuis Abraham jusqu'à la fin du XVe siècle de J.-C. : fragments de la Chronique de Moudjir-ed-dynIndex: pp 115, 148, 154, 266

External links 
 Official website 
 Arabic website 
 CBS statistics on Jaljuliya 
 Welcome To Jaljuliya
Survey of Western Palestine, Map 14:  IAA, Wikimedia commons

Arab localities in Israel
Triangle (Israel)
Local councils in Central District (Israel)